Patentleft is the practice of licensing patents (especially biological patents) for royalty-free use, on the condition that adopters license related improvements they develop under the same terms. Copyleft-style licensors seek "continuous growth of a universally accessible technology commons" from which they, and others, will benefit.

Patentleft is analogous to copyleft, a license that allows distribution of a copyrighted work and derived works, but only under the same or equivalent terms.

Uses
The Biological Innovation for Open Society (BiOS) project implemented a patentleft system to encourage re-contribution and collaborative innovation of their technology. BiOS holds patented technology for transferring genes in plants, and licenses the technology under the terms that, if a license holder improves the gene transfer tool and patents the improvement, then their improvement must be made available to all the other license holders.

The open patent idea is designed to be practiced by consortia of research-oriented companies and increasingly by standards bodies.  These also commonly use open trademark methods to ensure some compliance with a suite of compatibility tests, e.g. Java, X/Open both of which forbid the use of the mark by the non-compliant.

On October 12, 2001 the Free Software Foundation and Finite State Machine Labs Inc. (FSMLabs) announced a GPL-compliant open-patent license for FSMLabs' software patent, . Titled the Open RTLinux patent license Version 2, it provides for usage of this patent in accordance with the GPL.

See also
 Copyleft
 Gratis versus libre
 Open content
 Open Invention Network
 Open Patent Alliance
 Open source
 Patent troll
 Public domain
 Software patent
 Viral license

References

Further reading
 
  — Richard Stallman criticizes patentleft because of cost of applying for patents

External links
 https://wiki.p2pfoundation.net/Patentleft
 Open Hardware Licenses
 Standardized Terms and Conditions For Open Patenting
 Find Biological Parents

Patent law
Libre culture
Intellectual property law
Copyleft
Free culture movement